Berhala island is an island off Sumatra in Indonesia with an area of about 2.5 km2. It is located in the Berhala Strait between Jambi and Singkep.

In the past, the island was at the center of a provincial disputed since 1982, previously between Jambi and Riau, including the regency Riau Islands. On 2002, these regency divided into new province and switched dispute cases between Riau Islands and Jambi. The matter was brought for adjudication to Supreme Court, and on 2012, the Court awarded the island to Riau Islands.

Notes

Islands of Sumatra
Populated places in Indonesia